The Palace of Culture of Tirana was built on the Pazari i Vjeter area of Tirana by request of Enver Hoxha. For this construction, both the old bazaar and the historic mosque of Mahmud Muhsin Bey Stërmasi were destroyed under the rulership of the Albanian Labour Party in adherence to the communist country's declaration of state atheism. The Ottoman mosque had been built from 1837 to 1840 and had a tiled roof as well as a striking minaret with a sherefe.

The first stone of the new building was symbolically put by Nikita Khrushchev in 1959. The work was finished in 1963. The architecture is very similar to many communist era social buildings in Eastern Europe. There have been virtually no renovations to the building since its construction. The Palace of Culture includes the National Library of Albania and the National Theatre of Opera and Ballet of Albania.

See also
Academy of Music and Arts of Albania
National Theatre of Opera and Ballet of Albania
National Gallery of Figurative Arts of Albania

Notes and references

Socialist realism
Buildings and structures completed in 1963
Government buildings in Tirana